The following highways are numbered 234:

Australia 
 Borung Highway

Canada
 Manitoba Provincial Road 234
 Newfoundland and Labrador Route 234
 Prince Edward Island Route 234
 Quebec Route 234

Costa Rica
 National Route 234

India
 National Highway 234 (India)

Ireland
 R234 regional road

Italy
 Strada statale 234 Codognese

Japan
 Japan National Route 234

United States
 California State Route 234 (unbuilt)
 Florida State Road 234 (former)
 Georgia State Route 234
 Indiana State Road 234
 K-234 (Kansas highway)
 Kentucky Route 234
 Maine State Route 234
 Maryland Route 234
 Montana Secondary Highway 234
 New Mexico State Road 234
 New York State Route 234 (former)
 Oregon Route 234
 Pennsylvania Route 234
 Tennessee State Route 234
 Texas State Highway 234
 Texas State Highway Loop 234
 Utah State Route 234 (former)
 Virginia State Route 234
 Wyoming Highway 234